was a private junior college located in Aomori, Aomori Prefecture Japan. It was established in 1962, and was attached to Aomori University.

Department and Graduate Course

Departments 
 Course of information
 Course of library
 Course of sports
 Course of child

Available certifications 
 You can obtain Professional certification of Child care person in Course of child.
You can acquire license of junior high school teacher in second class in Course of information
 You can obtain Professional certification of librarian

See also 
 List of junior colleges in Japan in Course of child.

External links
 Aomori Junior College

Private universities and colleges in Japan
Japanese junior colleges
Universities and colleges in Aomori Prefecture
Educational institutions established in 1962
Aomori (city)
1962 establishments in Japan